The Church of St Peter and St Paul, East Drayton is a Grade I listed parish church in the Church of England in East Drayton.

History

The church was dates from the end of the 12th century. It was restored in 1857 by the Ecclesiastical Commissioners. The nave and aisles were restored in 1873 and the roof in 1982.

A pair of headstones in the churchyard are Grade II listed.

Organ

The church contains an organ dating from 1860 by J Halmshaw, which was brought from St Leonard's Church, Ragnall and installed here in 1995 by Anthony Herrod. A specification of the organ can be found on the National Pipe Organ Register.

References

Church of England church buildings in Nottinghamshire
East Drayton